Giacomo Manzari (born 21 September 2000) is an Italian footballer who plays  as a forward for  club Monopoli, on loan from Sassuolo.

Club career
Manzari is a youth product of his local side Bari, and joined Sassuolo in 2018. Manzari senior debut with Sassuolo in a 1–1 Serie A tie with Cagliari on 18 July 2020.

On 24 September 2020, he joined Serie C club Carrarese on loan.

On 23 August 2021, he went to Serie B side Frosinone on a two-year loan. On 27 August 2022, Frosinone arranged his sub-loan to Monopoli, with the consent of Sassuolo.

References

External links

2000 births
Living people
Footballers from Bari
Italian footballers
Association football forwards
U.S. Sassuolo Calcio players
Carrarese Calcio players
Frosinone Calcio players
S.S. Monopoli 1966 players
Serie A players
Serie B players
Serie C players